Michael Anthony Sotillo Cañari  (born September 23, 1984) is a Peruvian footballer who plays as a goalkeeper for Deportivo Municipal in Peruvian Primera Division (also known as Liga 1 Clausura).

Club career
Michael Sotillo began his career with Sport Boys in 2002.
He then had a brief spell with Segunda División playing for C.D. Universidad San Marcos in the 2007 season. 

He returned to Sport Boys in January 2008. He made his debut in the Torneo Descentralizado in round 2 of the 2008 season at home against Cienciano, when he replaced Salomon Libman in goal and managed to keep a clean-sheet.

References

1984 births
Living people
People from Tacna
Peruvian footballers
Peruvian Primera División players
Sport Boys footballers
Deportivo Universidad San Marcos footballers
Cobresol FBC footballers
Sport Huancayo footballers
Association football goalkeepers
Deportivo Binacional FC players